César Rocha Brito Ladeira, known as Cesar Ladeira (11 December 1910 — 8 September 1969) was a Brazilian journalist.  

Ladeira was one of the most famous radio hosts in Brazil.

References

External links
Official website

1910 births
1969 deaths
Brazilian journalists
Male journalists
People from Campinas
20th-century journalists